
Year 400 BC was a year of the pre-Julian Roman calendar. In the Roman Republic, it was known as the Year of the Tribunate of Esquilinus, Capitolinus, Vulso, Medullinus, Saccus and Vulscus (or, less frequently, year 354 Ab urbe condita). The denomination 400 BC for this year has been used in Europe since the early medieval period, when the Anno Domini calendar era became prevalent there.

Events 
 By place 
 Artaxerxes II, king of Persia, appoints Tissaphernes to take over all the districts in Asia Minor over which Artaxerxes II's brother Cyrus had been governor before his revolt.
 Xenophon's "Ten Thousand" make their way back to Greece, with most of the men enlisting with the Spartans. Xenophon's successful march through the Persian Empire encourages Sparta to turn on the Persians and begin wars against the Persians in Asia Minor.
 With the outbreak of the war between Sparta and the Persians, the Athenian admiral, Conon, obtains joint command, with Pharnabazus, of a Persian fleet.
 War breaks out between Sparta and Elis.
 London has its origins on a rise above marshy waters at the point where the Walbrook joins the River Thames. The Celtic king, Belin, rebuilds an earth wall surrounding a few dozen huts and orders a small landing place to be cut into the south side of the wall, along the river front, where a wooden quay is built (approximate date)
 Amyrtaeus of Sais successfully completes a revolt against Persian control by gaining control of all of Upper Egypt.
 The Olmec culture in Mesoamerica comes to an end as its city of La Venta is abandoned (approximate date).
 San Lorenzo Tenochtitlán is abandoned (approximate date).
 The Bianzhong of the Marquis Yi of Zheng were cast

 By topic 
 The catapult is invented by Greek engineers.
 The Mature classical period of sculpture ends in Ancient Greece and is succeeded by the fourth-century (Late Classical) period (approximate date).
 A model of the Acropolis of Athens is made. It is now kept at the Royal Ontario Museum in Toronto, Ontario, Canada (approximate date).
 Theodorus from Phokaia in Asia Minor, builds the Tholos of Delphi, the sanctuary of Athena Pronaia in Delphi (approximate date).
 Dionysius I, Greek tyrant of Syracuse, confiscates gold and silver coins and re-mints them, keeping the weight the same but changing the denomination from one to two drachmae — the first known official devaluation at the expense of the general population. A virulent inflation ensues (approximate date).
 Zoroastrianism becomes the faith of many Persians. The Zoroastrians believe in a struggle between their god, Mazda, and the devil. They believe that the birth of their founder, the prophet Zarathustra, was the beginning of a final epoch that is to end in an Armageddon and triumph of good and evil. 
 Brahmanism starts evolving in Hinduism, a process which takes place over the following 200 years (approximate date).

Births 
 Antipater, a Macedonian general (d. 319 BC)
 Parmenion, Macedonian general under Alexander the Great (approximate date)

Deaths 
 Aspasia of Miletus, widow of Pericles of Athens (approximate date) (b. c. 470 BC)
 Siddhārtha Gautama (also known as Buddha), founder of Buddhism (approximate date)
 Thucydides, Greek historian (approximate date) (b. c. 460 BC)

References